The John and Kittie Williams House is a historic house at 1009 Main Street in Webster, South Dakota.  It is a -story wood-frame structure, built c. 1909, and is now, as it was then, one of the grandest houses in the small community.  It is a Queen Anne Victorian in style, with a variety of gable projections on the roof, projecting bay sections, and porches.  The interior has elaborate Classical Revival woodwork, with Corinthian columns, wainscoting, and builtin cabinets.

The house was listed on the National Register of Historic Places in 2008.

References

Houses on the National Register of Historic Places in South Dakota
Queen Anne architecture in South Dakota
Houses completed in 1909
Houses in Day County, South Dakota
National Register of Historic Places in Day County, South Dakota